The Commissioner for Ethical Standards in Public Life in Scotland is an ombudsman in Scotland with the responsibility for investigating complaints about Members of the Scottish Parliament, councillors of the 32 Councils of Scotland, and members of Scottish public bodies. The Commissioner also monitors the appointment of members of specified public bodies in Scotland by the Scottish Ministers.

History
The post was created by the Public Services Reform (Commissioner for Ethical Standards in Public Life in Scotland etc.) Order 2013, legislation which came into force on 1 July 2013. Prior to that there were separate pieces of legislation to deal with complaints and investigations. The Commissioner's role in public standards is legislated for in the Ethical Standards in Public Life etc. (Scotland) Act 2000, Scottish Parliamentary Standards Commissioner Act 2002 and the Public Appointsments and Public Bodies etc. (Scotland) act 2003.

The Scottish Parliamentary Corporate Body has a statutory responsibility for appointment of the Commissioner, with the agreement of the Scottish Parliament.

Ms Anderson is a chartered accountant with over 20 years of specialist experience in regulation and compliance, gained mainly within professional services environments. She succeeds Bill Thomson CBE.

Remit and jurisdiction
The Commissioner and his team work in two areas:
 Public standards – investigating complaints about the conduct of Members of the Scottish Parliament (MSPs), local authority councillors and members of public bodies
 Public appointments – regulating how people are appointed to the boards of public bodies

References

External links
 

Scottish Parliamentary Corporate Body
2013 establishments in Scotland
Ombudsmen in Scotland
Government of Scotland
Scottish commissions and inquiries
Government agencies established in 2013
Organisations based in Edinburgh